Alexander Crummell (March 3, 1819 – September 10, 1898) was a pioneering African-American Christian minister, academic and African nationalist. Ordained as an Episcopal priest in the United States, Crummell went to England in the late 1840s to raise money for his church by lecturing about American slavery. Abolitionists supported his three years of study at Cambridge University, where Crummell developed concepts of pan-Africanism and was the school's first recorded Black student and graduate. 

In 1853 Crummell moved to Liberia, where he worked to convert Africans to Christianity and educate them, as well as to persuade African American colonists of his ideas. He wanted to attract American blacks to Africa on a civilizing mission. Crummell lived and worked for 20 years in Liberia and appealed to American blacks to join him, but did not gather wide support for his ideas.

After returning to the United States in 1872, Crummell was called to St. Mary's Episcopal Mission in Washington, DC.  In 1875, he and his congregation founded St. Luke's Episcopal Church, the first independent black Episcopal church in the city. Crummell served as rector there until his retirement in 1894.

Early life and education
Crummell was born in 1819 in New York City to Charity Hicks, a free woman of color, and Boston Crummell, a former slave.  According to Crummell's account, his paternal grandfather was an ethnic Temne, born in what is now Sierra Leone; he was captured and sold into slavery when he was around 13 years old. Both of Crummell's parents were active abolitionists. Their home was used to publish the first African-American newspaper, Freedom's Journal. Boston Crummell instilled in his son a sense of unity with Africans living in Africa. His parents' influence and these early experiences within the abolitionist movement shaped Crummell's values, beliefs, and actions throughout the rest of his life. Even as a boy in New York, Crummell worked for the American Anti-Slavery Society.

Crummell began his formal education in the African Free School No. 2 and at home with private tutors. Other African-American men who became active in the abolitionist movement, such as James McCune Smith (a pioneering doctor) and Henry Highland Garnet, also graduated from this school. Crummell attended the Canal Street High School. After graduating, Crummell and his friend Garnet attended the new Noyes Academy in New Hampshire. However, a mob opposed to Blacks attacked and destroyed the school. Crummell next enrolled in the Oneida Institute in central New York, a hotbed of abolitionism. While there, Crummell decided to become an Episcopal priest. His prominence as a young intellectual earned him a spot as keynote speaker at the anti-slavery New York State Convention of Negroes when it met in Albany in 1840.

Denied admission to the General Theological Seminary in New York City because of his race, Crummell went on to study and receive holy orders; he was ordained in 1842 in Massachusetts. However, "he soon found that there was little scope for black priests." As he struggled against ambivalence and low church attendance in his church in Providence, Rhode Island, Crummell traveled to Philadelphia to petition the area bishop for a larger congregation. Philadelphia had a large free black community. Bishop Onderdonk replied, "I will receive you into this diocese on one condition: No negro priest can sit in my church convention and no negro church must ask for representation there." Crummell is said to have paused for a moment, and then said: "I will never enter your diocese on such terms."

Career

Studies and lectures in England
 
In 1847, Crummell traveled to England to raise money for his congregation at the Church of the Messiah. While there, Crummell preached, spoke about abolitionism in the United States, and raised almost $2,000.  From 1849 to 1853, Crummell studied at Queens' College, Cambridge, sponsored by Benjamin Brodie, William Wilberforce, Arthur Penrhyn Stanley, James Anthony Froude, and Thomas Babington Macaulay. Although Crummell had to take his finals twice to receive his degree, he became the first officially recorded black student to graduate from Cambridge University. While it appears he was not the first black student at Cambridge, he is the first for whom official records exist.

At his graduation  Crummell endured a moment of racist heckling until another student, E. W. Benson, counter-heckled in his defence:

While in Cambridge, Crummell hosted the abolitionist lecturer William Wells Brown, who had escaped slavery in 1834. Crummell continued to travel around Britain and speak out about slavery and the plight of black people.  During this period, Crummmell formulated the concept of Pan-Africanism, which became his central belief for the advancement of the African race. Crummell believed that in order to achieve their potential, the African race as a whole, including those in the Americas, the West Indies, and Africa, needed to unify under the banner of race. To Crummell, racial solidarity could solve slavery, discrimination, and continued attacks on the African race. He decided to move to Africa to spread his message.

In Liberia
Crummell arrived in Liberia in 1853, at the point in that country's history when Americo-Liberians had begun to govern the former colony for free American blacks. Crummell came as a missionary of the American Episcopal Church, with the stated aim of converting native Africans. Though Crummell had previously opposed colonization, his civilizing mission experiences in Liberia changed his mind.

His name appears on an 1859 document signed by citizens of the county of Maryland, Liberia.

Crummell began to preach that "enlightened," or Christianized, ethnic Africans in the United States and the West Indies had a duty to go to Africa. There, they would help civilize and Christianize the continent.  When enough native Africans had been converted, they would take over converting the rest of the population, while those from the western hemisphere would work to educate the people and run a republican government. Crummell influenced Liberian intellectual and religious life, as preacher, prophet, social analyst, and educationist, proclaiming a special place for Africa in the history of redemption, as it had God-given moral and religious potential. But, Crummell never realized his grand scheme. Most American blacks were more interested in gaining equal rights in the United States than going to colonize or convert Africans. While Crummell successfully served as both a pastor and professor in Liberia, he could not create the society he envisioned. In 1873, fearing his life was in danger from the Americo-Liberian ascendancy, Crummell returned to the United States.

Return to the United States

He was called as pastor for St. Mary's Episcopal Mission in Washington, DC, in the Foggy Bottom area. It was then a predominately African-American, working-class neighborhood. In 1875, he and his congregation founded St. Luke's Episcopal Church, the first independent black Episcopal church in the city.  They raised funds to construct a new church on upper 15th Street, N.W., in the Columbia Heights area, beginning in 1876, and celebrated Thanksgiving in 1879 in it. Crummell served as rector at St. Luke's until his retirement in 1894. The church was designated a National Historic Landmark in 1976. Crummell taught at Howard University from 1895 to 1897.

Despite frustrations, Crummell never stopped working for the racial solidarity he had advocated for so long. Throughout his life, Crummell worked for black nationalism, self-help, and separate economic development. He spent the last years of his life founding the American Negro Academy, the first organization to support African-American scholars, which opened in 1897 in Washington, DC. Alexander Crummell died in Red Bank, New Jersey, in 1898.

Influence
Crummell was an important voice within the abolition movement and a leader of the Pan-African ideology.  Crummell's legacy can be seen not only in his personal achievements, but also in the influence he exerted on other black nationalists and Pan-Africanists, such as Marcus Garvey, Paul Laurence Dunbar, and W. E. B. Du Bois.  Du Bois paid tribute to Crummell with a memorable essay entitled "Of Alexander Crummell", collected in his 1903 book, The Souls of Black Folk.

In 2002, the scholar Molefi Kete Asante listed Alexander Crummell on his list of 100 Greatest African Americans.

Legacy and honors
Crummell's private papers are held by the Schomburg Center for Research in Black Culture, of the New York Public Library in Harlem. The Alexander Crummell School in Washington, DC, was named after him. Crummell is included on a New Hampshire historical marker (number 246) commemorating Noyes Academy in Canaan, New Hampshire. In 2021, Queens' College, Cambridge established the Alexander Crummell Scholarships for students from disadvantaged backgrounds or those currently under-represented at Cambridge University. A portrait photograph of Crummell is mounted in the Essex Room of the President's Lodge at Queens' College.
A street is named after him in Annapolis, Md

Veneration
Crummell is honored with a feast day on the liturgical calendar of the Episcopal Church (USA) on September 10.

Writings

 
 
 
 
 
 The future of Africa: being addresses, sermons, etc., etc., delivered in the Republic of Liberia

See also

National Afro-American League, set up in 1890 and based on racial solidarity and self-help
Black separatism, as distinguished from black nationalism

Notes

References
Wilson Jeremiah Moses: "Alexander Crummell". American National Biography Online. 2000. Oxford University Press. 5 February 2008.
Wilson Jeremiah Moses: Alexander Crummell: A Study of Civilization and Discontent. New York: Oxford University Press, 1989.
Rigsby, Gregory, U.. Alexander Crummell: Pioneer in the Nineteenth-Century Pan-African Thought. New York: Greenwood Press, 1987.
Moss, Alfred A. The American Negro Academy: Voice of the Talented Tenth.  Louisiana State University Press, 1981.  
Wahle, Kathleen O'Mara. "Alexander Crummell: Black Evangelist and Pan-Negro Nationalist." Phylon 29(1968): 388–395.

External links
 
 
 
 

People from Washington, D.C.
1819 births
1898 deaths
Americo-Liberian people
Activists for African-American civil rights
African-American abolitionists
American pan-Africanists
Religious leaders from New York City
Alumni of Queens' College, Cambridge
Anglican saints
Temne people
People of Temne descent
African-American Episcopalians
Activists from New York City
Oneida Institute alumni
Noyes Academy students who enrolled at the Oneida Institute
African Free School alumni
Christian abolitionists
19th-century American Episcopalians